World Para Volleyball Championship, was played first time at 1983.

WOVD World Championships

Sitting volleyball

Men's Sitting - Past winners

 Ranking

Women's Sitting - Past winners

 Ranking

Standing

Beach

Ranking

Men
 1985  (10) Iran  Yugoslavia Netherlands Sweden	Norway	Hungary	Germany	Finland	Austria	Great Britain	 	 	 	 	 	 
 1986	(13) Iran	Hungary	Netherlands	Yugoslavia	Norway	Germany	Finland	Sweden	Austria	Czechoslovakia	Egypt	USA	GB	 	 	 
 1989	(9) Netherlands	Hungary	Germany	Norway	Finland	Iraq	GB	Switzerland	USA	 	 	 	 	 	 	 
 1990	(9) Iran	Netherlands	Yugoslavia	Hungary	Germany	Norway	Sweden	Finland	GB	 	 	 	 	 	 	 
 1994	(8) Iran	Norway	Netherlands	Finland	Hungary	Germany	Slovenia	Sweden	 	 	 	 	 	 	 	 
 1998	(12) Iran	Finland	Bosnia I Hercegovina	Netherlands	Germany	Norway	Egypt	Kazakhstan	Iraq	Slovenia	Japan	Australia	 	 	 	 
 2002	(10) Bosnia I Hercegovina	Germany	Iran	Egypt	Netherlands	Iraq	Hungary	Japan	Morocco	USA	 	 	 	 	 	 
 2006	{12) Bosnia I Hercegovina	Iran	Egypt	Germany	Russia	China	Croatia	Netherlands	USA	Iraq	Brazil	Japan	 	 	 	 
 2010	(12) Iran	Boznia I Hercegovina	Egypt	Russia	Ukraine	Germany	China	Brazil	Croatia	USA	Serbia	Netherlands	 	 	 	 
 2014	(12) Boznia I Hercegovina	Brazil	Iran	Egypt	Russia	Germany	Ukraine	China	Netherlands	USA	Croatia	Poland	 	 	 	 
 2018	(16) Iran	Boznia I Hercegovina	Brazil	Ukraine	Russia	Egypt	China	USA	Kazakhstan	Germany	Netherlands	Poland	Croatia	Iraq	Japan	Rwanda
 2022	(16) Iran	Bosnia and Herzegovina	Brazil	Egypt	Germany	United States	Kazakhstan	Ukraine	Iraq	Croatia	Canada	Poland	Rwanda	Netherlands	Serbia	Japan

Women
 1994	(6) Netherlands	Latvia	Lithuania	Russia	Germany	Ukraine	 	 	 	 	 	 
 2000	(8) Netherlands	Finland	Slovenia	Germany	Japan	Mongolia	Ukraine	Iran	 	 	 	 
 2002	(8) Netherlands	Slovenia	Finland	China	Lithuania	Japan	Ukraine	Iran	 	 	 	 
 2006	(8) Netherlands	China	Slovenia	Lithuania	USA	Ukraine	Japan	Brazil	 	 	 	 
 2010	(12) China	USA	Ukraine	Netherlands	Slovenia	Germany	Russia	Lithuania	Japan	Brazil	GB	Canada
 2014	(12) China	USA	Russia	Netherlands	Ukraine	Brazil	Slovenia	Finland	Japan	Germany	GB	Poland	 
 2018	(16) Russia	USA	China	Italy	Brasil	Ukraine	Canada	Netherlands	Iran	Japan	Rwanda	Finland	Slovenia	Hungary	Egypt	Croatia
 2022	(13) Brazil	Canada	United States	Slovenia	Italy	Germany	Ukraine	Rwanda	Iran	Finland	Hungary	Poland	Bosnia and Herzegovina

Youth World Para Volleyball Championship

Junior World Championships

See also
Pieter Joon - World Organization Volleyball for Disabled (WOVD) founder and former president
Volleyball variations
Volleyball at the Summer Paralympics
World ParaVolley
Sitting volleyball

References

External links

VolleySlide
Sitting volleyball on International Paralympic Committee website
 https://web.archive.org/save/http://www.sittingvolleyball.info/book/major-competitions

Sitting volleyball
World championships in volleyball
Recurring sporting events established in 1983